Jack Britton (October 14, 1885 – March 27, 1962) was an American boxer who was the first three-time world welterweight boxing champion. Born William J. Breslin in Clinton, New York, his professional career lasted for 25 years beginning in 1905. He holds the world record for the number of title bouts fought in a career with 37 (18 of which ended in no decisions), many against his arch-rival Ted "Kid" Lewis, against whom he fought 20 times. Statistical boxing website BoxRec lists Britton as the No. 6 ranked welterweight of all time while The Ring Magazine founder Nat Fleischer placed him at No. 3. He was inducted into the Ring Magazine Hall of Fame in 1960 and the International Boxing Hall of Fame as a first-class member in 1990.

Ernest Hemingway's short story "Fifty Grand" is based on the Jack Britton/Mickey Walker fight in Madison Square Garden on November 1, 1922. Other sources, like the famous writer of boxing, Budd Schulberg,  link this story to the Britton/Benny Leonard fight the previous June in the Bronx Hippodrome where Leonard lost in what appeared to be an intentional foul. Leonard was specifically mentioned in the first draft of Hemingway's short story.

World Welterweight Title Defense Against Benny Leonard
"This fight is one of the most controversial in the history of the ring, as shown by a reading of about fifteen accounts by New York sportswriters (supplied by Jack Kincaid). The writers were unanimous in having Britton well ahead after twelve fast rounds. He had crowded Leonard, cleverly outboxed him, and even marked him up. Leonard did have a good round eleven, staggering Britton twice, but Jack had a big 12th. In the 13th, Leonard landed a left to Britton's body which caused him to gasp, folding his hands over his mid-section, and go down to his knees. Jack seemed to claim a foul (although he said afterward that he didn't), but Referee Patsy Haley disallowed the claim. Britton came up to one knee and Leonard rushed in and struck him a light blow, causing the referee to disqualify Benny. Leonard claimed that this final blow was not a foul, but none of the reporters agreed. The reporters, who included Damon Runyon, Sid Mercer, Hype Igoe, W.R. McGeehan, and George Underwood, drew various conclusions about the ending. Some thought that the conclusion was staged, others did not. The spectators seemed inclined to believe that something had been put over on them, but perhaps the best approach is to take the result at face value."

Professional boxing record
All information in this section is derived from BoxRec, unless otherwise stated.

Official record

All newspaper decisions are officially regarded as "no decision" bouts and are not counted in the win/loss/draw column.

Unofficial record

Record with the inclusion of newspaper decisions in the win/loss/draw column.

See also
Lineal championship
List of welterweight boxing champions

References

External links
 
 Cyber Boxing Zone Bio
 Hickok Sports Bio

|-

|-

https://titlehistories.com/boxing/wba/wba-world-wl.html
https://titlehistories.com/boxing/na/usa/ny/nysac-wl.html

1885 births
1962 deaths
Boxers from New York (state)
American male boxers
Welterweight boxers
World welterweight boxing champions
World boxing champions